The Church of Reinhardtsgrimma is a Lutheran parish church in Reinhardtsgrimma, a part of Glashütte in Sächsische Schweiz-Osterzgebirge in Saxony, Germany. It contains a pipe organ built in 1731 to the designs of Gottfried Silbermann.

Architecture 

The church was refurbished in 1742. The building consists of a long, narrow nave, two small ridge turrets and a massive bell tower in the west. The choir is covered by two late Gothic fan vaults.

Interior 
The altar with the relief of the Last Supper was carved in 1602 and refurbished in 1836. The pulpit was built around 1670, and its stairway was decorated with paintings by Jacob Hennig from Pirna in 1672.

Pipe organ 

The masterpiece of the church is the organ by Gottfried Silbermann, which was inaugurated in 1731.

The old organ stood in an inappropriate position in the choir and was still tuned with the non-equal division of the octave. Silbermann concluded that the organ was beyond repair and offered in his proposal of 17 October 1725 a concept of a new instrument,  an only slightly larger organ with two manuals. He estimated the cost at 800 thaler excluding painting and carpentry, which at that time was an amount equal to the salary of a medium to senior civil servant. Additionally, he wanted to be reimbursed for transport and lodging. The contract was probably signed in June 1729, when Silbermann agreed to provide a guarantee during his lifetime, and accepted to be paid in six rates until the end of 1732.

The organ had Gottfried Silberman's serial number op. 21. It was sanctified on 6 January 1731. Its approval was granted by Emanuel Behnisch, then the organist of the Kreuzkirche, Dresden, who commented that he found the new organ good in all parts ("[für] allenthalben tüchtig befunden").

Refurbishments were conducted in 1852 by the organ builder  of Dippoldiswalde and in 1940 by Gebr. Jehmlich in Dresden. The most important tasks were the new intonation of the organ pipes, the reconstruction of the V-shaped bellows of the wind system and tuning according to the meantone temperament.

The following table list the organ stops in the original nomenclature of Gottfried Silbermann:

 Couplers: II/I (Manualschiebekoppel), I/P
 Additional organ stops: Tremulant
 Pitch: Chorton, a1=465 Hz
 Tuning: Originally "well tempered"; since 1997 a newly developed temperament by Kristian Wegscheider

The organist Helmut Walcha wrote about this organ in 1933:

The main organist of the Kreuzkirche, the Kreuzorganist Herbert Collum, so admired this "little miracle in the art of organ building" ("das kleine Wunder der Orgelbaukunst"), that he initiated an annual series of Collum Concerts in the church, always beginning on Ascension Day.

Notes

References 
  Rietschel, Christian; Langhof, Bernd: Dorfkirchen in Sachsen. Evangelische Verlagsanstalt, Berlin 1963, .
 Greß, Frank-Harald: Die Orgeln Gottfried Silbermanns. Sandstein, 2001, .

Further reading

External links 

 
 

Lutheran churches in Saxony
Glashütte
Pipe organ